Henry Raymond McCrae (24 July 1910 – 10 July 1984) was a former Australian rules footballer who played with Melbourne in the Victorian Football League (VFL).

Notes

External links 

1910 births
Australian rules footballers from Victoria (Australia)
Melbourne Football Club players
1984 deaths